Middle Harling Fen is a  biological Site of Special Scientific Interest south of East Harling in Norfolk.

This calcareous valley fen has several springs and a wide variety of types of grassland, including both wet and dry communities. There are uncommon flora such as adder's tongue and yellow rattle, and the breeding birds are diverse.

The site is private land with no public access.

References

Sites of Special Scientific Interest in Norfolk